Giuseppe Branzoli (1835 in Cento – 21 January 1909, in Rome) was a violinist, mandolinist, composer, author,  educator at the Liceo Musicale di St. Cecilia in Rome, and the founder of the periodical IL mandolin Romano. His compositions were for violin, mandolin, flute and cello, as well as church music.

He taught at Cento and Bologna and played first violin at the Theatre of Apollo Orchestra in Rome. Also played in the Theatre of Massimo in Rome. After his son died and he used music as a way to "stifle and conquer his grief". He taught as a professor of stringed instruments at the college level and worked as a conductor of the Philharmonic Society. He also helped found the Liceo Musicale di St. Cecilia in Rome and taught as a professor of harmony there and worked as a librarian.

Compositions
He composed for the mandolin band. He also did operas, Torquato Tasso and Sorrento which were successful. Wrote an elegy for orchestra, A tear over the tome of Meyerbeer.

Une Larme sur la tombe de Gaetano Donizdth. Elegie pour violon avec accompagnement de piano par Giuseppe Branzole. Op. 51 (A Tear at the tomb of Gaetano Donizdth. Elegie for violin with piano accompaniment by Giuseppe Branzole. Op 51)
Le mariage polka pour piano op. 53 (Marriage polka for piano op. 53)
Rimembranze soave: (facili). (Sweet remembrances: (easy))
Margherita Polka

Books and periodical

While in Rome, he devoted himself to historical musical research, with Professor Rodolfo Berwin. He also founded the periodical Ill mandolino Romano in an effort to advance the mandolin and guitar. The publication ran from 15 January 1907 until two years after his death in 1909.

He wrote the instruction book, A Theoretical and practical method for the mandolin, a two volume set published in 1875 by Franchi, in French and English. Each book in the set contained progressive studies, sonatas and duos for two mandolins. The method won first prize at the International Musical Exhibition in Bologna in 1888. Two years later he revised the set, and won  at the Palace of Industry Exhibition in Paris. He also wrote methods for the guitar and the lute, with history and illustrations.

The lute and its story
Historical handbook for violinists
Historical and practical method for the lute (pub 1891 by Venturini in Florence) contains illustration of lute made by Stradivarius in 1700
Theoretical and practical method for the mandolin
Ricerche sullo studio del liuto (Research on the study of the lute)
Delle' Udito schediasmi musicali ; conferenza teruta in Bologna nella sala dei Fiorentini la sera del 5. Marzo 1891

See also
 List of mandolinists (sorted)

References

External links
MandoIsland, has biography and links to public domain version of Branzoli's mandolin method
Just Classical Guitar Club, has bio of Branzoli
Online book, Ricerche sullo studio del liuto (1889)
Online book, Manuale storico del violinista: corredato da un sunto cronologisco storico (1894)
Online biography (Italian)
SIte with photo of Giuseppe Branzoli and a folk-music orchestra.
Sheet music; has Margherita Polka

1835 births
1909 deaths
19th-century classical composers
19th-century Italian composers
19th-century Italian male musicians
20th-century classical composers
20th-century Italian composers
20th-century Italian male musicians
Italian classical composers
Italian classical mandolinists
Italian classical violinists
Italian male classical composers
Italian male writers
Italian music educators
Male classical violinists